This is a list of butterflies of the Korean Peninsula, consisting of North Korea and South Korea. About 280 species are known from the Korean Peninsula. The butterflies (mostly diurnal) and moths (mostly nocturnal) together make up the taxonomic order Lepidoptera.

Hesperiidae
Aeromachus inachus (Menetries, 1859)
Bibasis aquilina (Speyer, 1879)
Bibasis striata (Hewitson, [1867])
Carterocephalus argyrostigma Eversmann, 1851
Carterocephalus dieckmanni Graeser, 1888
Carterocephalus palaemon (Pallas, 1771)
Carterocephalus silvicola (Meigen, 1829)
Choaspes benjaminii (Guerin-Meneville, 1843)
Daimio tethys (Menetries, 1857)
Erynnis montanus (Bremer, 1861)
Erynnis popoviana Nordmann, 1851
Hesperia florinda (Butler, 1878)
Heteropterus morpheus (Pallas, 1771)
Isoteinon lamprospilus C. & R. Felder, 
Leptalina unicolor (Bremer & Grey, 1853)
Lobocla bifasciata (Bremer & Grey, 1853)
Muschampia gigas (Bremer, 1864)
Ochlodes ochracea (Bremer, 1861)
Ochlodes subhyalina (Bremer & Grey, 1853)
Ochlodes sylvanus (Esper, 1777)
Ochlodes venata (Bremer & Grey, 1853)
Parnara guttatus (Bremer & Grey, 1853)
Pelopidas jansonis (Butler, 1878)
Pelopidas mathias (Fabricius, 1798)
Pelopidas sinensis (Mabille, 1877)
Polytremis pellucida (Murray, 1875)
Polytremis zina (Evans, 1932)
Potanthus flava (Murray, 1875)
Pyrgus alveus (Hübner, 1802)
Pyrgus maculatus (Bremer & Grey, 1853)
Pyrgus malvae (Linnaeus, 1758)
Pyrgus speyeri (Staudinger, 1887)
Satarupa nymphalis (Speyer, 1879)
Spialia orbifer (Hübner, 1823)
Thymelicus leonina (Butler, 1878)
Thymelicus lineola (Ochsenheimer, 1808)
Thymelicus sylvatica (Bremer, 1861)

Lycaenidae
Agriades optilete (Knoch, 1781)
Ahlbergia ferrea (Butler, 1866)
Ahlbergia frivaldszkyi (Lederer, 1855)
Antigius attilia (Bremer, 1861)
Antigius butleri (Fenton, 1881)
Araragi enthea (Janson, 1877)
Arhopala bazalus (Hewitson, 1862)
Arhopala japonica (Murray, 1875)
Aricia artaxerxes (Fabricius, 1793)
Aricia chinensis (Murray, 1874)
Artopoetes pryeri (Murray, 1873)
Celastrina argiolus (Linnaeus, 1758)
Celastrina filipjevi (Riley, 1934)
Celastrina oreas (Leech, 1893)
Celastrina sugitanii (Matsumura, 1919)
Chrysozephyrus brillantinus (Staudinger, 1887)
Chrysozephyrus smaragdinus (Bremer, 1861)
Cigaritis takanonis (Matsumura, 1906)
Coreana raphaelis (Oberthur, 1881)
Cupido argiades (Pallas, 1771)
Cupido minimus (Fuessly, 1775)
Curetis acuta Moore, 1877
Cyaniris semiargus (Rottemburg, 1775)
Eumedonia eumedon (Esper, 1780)
Favonius cognatus (Staudinger, 1892)
Favonius koreanus Kim, 2006
Favonius korshunovi (Dubatolov & Sergeev, 1982)
Favonius orientalis (Murray, 1875)
Favonius saphirinus (Staudinger, 1887)
Favonius taxila (Bremer, 1861)
Favonius ultramarinus (Fixsen, 1887)
Favonius yuasai Shirozu, 1948
Glaucopsyche lycormas (Butler, 1866)
Jamides bochus (Stoll, 1782)
Japonica lutea (Hewitson, 1865)
Japonica saepestriata (Hewitson, 1865)
Lampides boeticus (Linnaeus, 1767)
Luthrodes pandava (Horsfield, 1829)
Lycaena dispar (Haworth, 1803)
Lycaena helle (Schiffermuller, 1775)
Lycaena hippothoe (Linnaeus, 1761)
Lycaena phlaeas (Linnaeus, 1761)
Lycaena virgaureae (Linnaeus, 1758)
Neozephyrus japonicus (Murray, 1875)
Niphanda fusca (Bremer & Grey, 1853)
Phengaris alcon (Denis & Schiffermuller, 1776)
Phengaris arionides (Staudinger, 1887)
Phengaris cyanecula (Eversmann, 1848)
Phengaris kurentzovi (Sibatani, Saigusa & Hirowatari, 1994)
Phengaris teleius (Bergstrasser, 1779)
Plebejus argus (Linnaeus, 1758)
Plebejus argyrognomon (Bergstrasser, 1779)
Plebejus subsolanus (Eversmann, 1851)
Polyommatus amandus (Schneider, 1792)
Polyommatus icarus (Rottemburg, 1775)
Polyommatus tsvetaevi Kurentzov, 1970
Protantigius superans (Oberthur, 1913)
Pseudozizeeria maha (Kollar, 1848)
Rapala arata (Bremer, 1861)
Rapala caerulea (Bremer & Grey, [1851])
Satyrium eximia (Fixsen, 1887)
Satyrium herzi (Fixsen, 1887)
Satyrium latior (Fixsen, 1887)
Satyrium pruni (Linnaeus, 1758)
Satyrium prunoides (Staudinger, 1887)
Satyrium w-album (Knoch, 1782)
Scolitantides orion (Pallas, 1771)
Shirozua jonasi (Janson, 1877)
Sinia divina (Fixsen, 1887)
Taraka hamada (Druce, 1875)
Thecla betulae (Linnaeus, 1758)
Thecla betulina Staudinger, 1887
Thermozephyrus ataxus (Westwood, [1851])
Tongeia fischeri (Eversmann, 1843)
Udara albocaerulea (Moore, 1879)
Udara dilectus (Moore, 1879)
Ussuriana michaelis (Oberthur, 1881)
Wagimo signata (Butler, 1881)
Zizina otis (Fabricius, 1787)

Nymphalidae
Aglais io (Linnaeus, 1758)
Aglais urticae (Linnaeus, 1758)
Aldania deliquata (Stichel, 1908)
Aldania raddei (Bremer, 1861)
Aldania themis (Leech, 1890)
Aldania thisbe (Menetries, 1859)
Apatura ilia (Denis & Schiffermuller, 1775)
Apatura iris (Linnaeus, 1758)
Apatura metis Freyer, 1829
Aphantopus hyperantus (Linnaeus, 1758)
Araschnia burejana Bremer, 1861
Araschnia levana (Linnaeus, 1758)
Argynnis anadyomene C. & R. Felder, 1862
Argynnis childreni Gray, 1831
Argynnis hyperbius (Linnaeus, 1763)
Argynnis laodice (Pallas, 1771)
Argynnis paphia (Linnaeus, 1758)
Argynnis ruslana Motschulsky, 1866
Argynnis sagana Doubleday, [1847]
Argynnis zenobia Leech, 1890
Boloria angarensis (Erschoff, 1870)
Boloria euphrosyne (Linnaeus, 1758)
Boloria oscarus (Eversmann, 1844)
Boloria perryi (Butler, 1882)
Boloria selene (Denis & Schiffermüller, 1775)
Boloria selenis (Eversmann, 1837)
Boloria thore (Hübner, [1803-1804])
Boloria titania (Esper, 1790)
Brenthis daphne (Denis & Schiffermüller, 1775)
Brenthis ino (Rottemburg, 1775)
Chalinga pratti (Leech, 1890)
Chitoria ulupi (Doherty, 1889)
Coenonympha amaryllis (Stoll, 1782)
Coenonympha glycerion (Borkhausen, 1788)
Coenonympha hero (Linnaeus, 1761)
Coenonympha oedippus (Fabricius, 1787)
Cyrestis thyodamas Boisduval, 1836
Danaus chrysippus (Linnaeus, 1758)
Danaus genutia (Cramer, 1779)
Dichorragia nesimachus Boisduval, 1836
Dilipa fenestra (Leech, 1891)
Erebia cyclopius (Eversmann, 1844)
Erebia edda Menetries, 1854
Erebia embla (Thunberg, 1791)
Erebia kozhantshikovi Sheljuzhko, 1925
Erebia ligea (Linnaeus, 1758)
Erebia neriene (Bober, 1809)
Erebia radians Staudinger, 1886
Erebia rossii Curtis, 1835
Erebia theano (Tauscher, 1809)
Erebia wanga Bremer, 1864
Fabriciana nerippe (C. & R. Felder, 1862)
Fabriciana niobe (Linnaeus, 1758)
Fabriciana vorax (Butler, 1871)
Euphydryas ichnea (Boisduval, 1833)
Euphydryas sibirica (Staudinger, 1861)
Hestina assimilis (Linnaeus, 1758)
Hestina japonica (C. & R. Felder, 1862)
Hipparchia autonoe (Esper, 1783)
Hypolimnas bolina (Linnaeus, 1758)
Hypolimnas misippus Linnaeus, 1764
Junonia almana (Linnaeus, 1758)
Junonia orithya (Linnaeus, 1758)
Kirinia epaminondas (Staudinger, 1887)
Kirinia epimenides (Menetries, 1859)
Lethe diana (Butler, 1866)
Lethe marginalis (Motschulsky, 1860)
Libythea celtis (Laicharting, 1782)
Limenitis amphyssa Menetries, 1859
Limenitis camilla (Linnaeus, 1764)
Limenitis doerriesi Staudinger, 1892
Limenitis helmanni Lederer, 1853
Limenitis homeyeri Tancre, 1881
Limenitis moltrechti Kardakov, 1928
Limenitis populi (Linnaeus, 1758)
Limenitis sydyi Lederer, 1853
Lopinga achine (Scopoli, 1763)
Lopinga deidamia (Eversmann, 1851)
Melanargia epimede Staudinger, 1887
Melanargia halimede (Menetries, 1859)
Melanitis leda (Linnaeus, 1758)
Melanitis phedima (Cramer, [1780])
Melitaea ambigua (Menetries, 1859)
Melitaea arcesia Bremer, 1861
Melitaea britomartis Assmann, 1847
Melitaea diamina (Lang, 1789)
Melitaea didymoides Eversmann, 1847
Melitaea plotina Bremer, 1861
Melitaea protomedia Menetries, 1859
Melitaea scotosia Butler, 1878
Melitaea sutschana Staudinger, 1892
Mimathyma nycteis (Menetries, 1859)
Mimathyma schrenckii (Menetries, 1859)
Minois dryas (Scopoli, 1763)
Mycalesis francisca (Stoll, [1780])
Mycalesis gotama Moore, 1857
Neptis alwina Bremer & Grey, 1853
Neptis andetria Fruhstofer, 1913
Neptis philyra Menetries, 1859
Neptis philyroides Staudinger, 1887
Neptis pryeri Butler, 1871
Neptis rivularis (Scopoli, 1763)
Neptis sappho Pallas, 1771
Neptis speyeri Staudinger, 1887
Ninguta schrenckii (Menetries, 1858)
Nymphalis antiopa (Linnaeus, 1758)
Nymphalis canace (Linnaeus, 1763)
Nymphalis l-album (Esper, 1785)
Nymphalis xanthomelas (Denis & Schiffermuller, 1775)
Oeneis jutta (Hübner, 1806)
Oeneis magna Graeser, 1888
Oeneis mongolica (Oberthur, 1876)
Oeneis urda (Eversmann, 1847)
Parantica melaneus (Cramer, 1775)
Parantica sita (Kollar, 1844)
Polygonia c-album (Linnaeus, 1758)
Polygonia c-aureum (Linnaeus, 1758)
Sasakia charonda (Hewitson, 1862)
Sephisa princeps (Fixsen, 1887)
Speyeria aglaja (Linnaeus, 1758)
Triphysa albovenosa Erschoff, 1885
Vanessa cardui (Linnaeus, 1758)
Vanessa indica (Herbst, 1794)
Ypthima baldus (Fabricius, 1775)
Ypthima motschulskyi (Bremer & Grey, 1853)
Ypthima multistriata Butler, 1883

Papilionidae
Atrophaneura alcinous (Klug, 1836)
Graphium sarpedon (Linnaeus, 1758)
Luehdorfia puziloi (Erschoff, 1872)
Papilio bianor Cramer, 1777
Papilio helenus Linnaeus, 1758
Papilio maackii Menetries, 1859
Papilio machaon Linnaeus, 1758
Papilio macilentus Janson, 1877
Papilio memnon Linnaeus, 1758
Papilio protenor Cramer, [1775]
Papilio xuthus Linnaeus, 1767
Parnassius bremeri Bremer, 1864
Parnassius eversmanni Menetries, 1849
Parnassius nomion Fischer de Waldheim, 1823
Parnassius stubbendorfii Menetries, 1849
Sericinus montela Gray, 1852

Pieridae
Anthocharis scolymus Butler, 1866
Aporia crataegi (Linnaeus, 1758)
Aporia hippia (Bremer, 1861)
Catopsilia pomona (Fabricius, 1775)
Colias erate (Esper, 1805)
Colias fieldii Menetries, 1855
Colias heos (Herbst, 1792)
Colias palaeno (Linnaeus, 1761)
Colias tyche Bober, 1812
Eurema brigitta (Stoll, [1780])
Eurema hecabe (Linnaeus, 1758)
Eurema laeta (Boisduval, 1836)
Gonepteryx mahaguru Gistel, 1857
Gonepteryx maxima Butler, 1885
Leptidea amurensis Menetries, 1859
Leptidea morsei Fenton, 1881
Pieris canidia (Linnaeus, 1768)
Pieris dulcinea Butler, 1882
Pieris melete Menetries, 1857
Pieris rapae (Linnaeus, 1758)
Pontia chloridice (Hübner, 1803-1818)
Pontia edusa (Fabricius, 1777)

References 
  and  2010: Butterflies of the Korean peninsula. Sŏul: Chayŏn kwa Saengt’ae, 430 p.

but
Korea
K